Shin Myung Hoon (born November 16, 1981) is an amateur boxer from South Korea who has medaled repeatedly at Asian Games.

Career
He won a bronze in 2002.

He also competed at the 2006 Asian Games in the Light welterweight (-64 kg) division ere he upset Dilshod Mahmudov and won the silver medal in the bout against Thailand's Olympic champion Manus Boonjumnong (11-22).

References

1981 births
Living people
South Korean male boxers
Asian Games medalists in boxing
Asian Games silver medalists for South Korea
Asian Games bronze medalists for South Korea
Boxers at the 2002 Asian Games
Boxers at the 2006 Asian Games
Medalists at the 2006 Asian Games
Medalists at the 2002 Asian Games
Light-welterweight boxers